The church of San Gregorio Barbarigo is a place of Catholic worship in Rome, located in the EUR district on Via delle Montagne Rocciose.

History

The church of San Gregorio Barbarigo was built between 1970 and 1972 by the architect Giuseppe Vaccaro as the home of the parish, established January 28, 1964 with the decree of the Cardinal Vicar Clemente Micara Qua celeritate. Since 1973 is the seat of the cardinal's title of "San Gregorio Barbarigo alle Tre Fontane".

The church is dedicated to the Venetian saint Gregorio Barbarigo (1625–1697), who was cardinal and bishop of Padua, where he worked tirelessly for the implementation of the Council of Trent reform.

List of Cardinal Protectors
 Maurice Michael Otunga (5 March 1973 - 6 September 2003)
 Bernard Panafieu (21 October 2003 – 12 November 2017)
 Désiré Tsarahazana (28 June 2018 - )

References

External links
 San Gregorio Barbarigo

Titular churches
Rome Q. XXIV Don Bosco
Roman Catholic churches completed in 1972
20th-century Roman Catholic church buildings in Italy